Live at Symphonica in Rosso is the third live album by Dutch singer Anouk. The album was released on March 14, 2014 via Anouk's own label, Goldilox Music.

Background
This live album was recorded during the Symphonica in Rosso-concerts on December 16 and 19, 2013, in the Ziggo Dome, Amsterdam. Anouk performed her songs in special arrangements with Guido's Orchestra. It is the first time that Anouk gave concerts with an orchestra.

With this album, Anouk was #1 in the Dutch Album Top 100 for the tenth time.

Track list

Album : song
 Together Alone (1997): Nobody's Wife
 Urban Solitude (1999): Michel
 Hotel New York (2004): One Word, Girl, Lost
 Who's Your Momma (2007): Modern World, If I Go
 For Bitter Or Worse (2009): Woman, For Bitter Or Worse, Three Days in a Row
 To Get Her Together (2011): Down & Dirty, I'm A Cliché, Killer Bee
 Sad Singalong Songs (2013): The Rules, The Good Life, Are You Lonely, Kill, Birds, Pretending As Always
 Not yet released: I Won't Play That Game, Wigger
 Wrecks We Adore by Trijntje Oosterhuis: Nothing At All

Chart performance

Weekly charts

Year-end charts

Personnel

Band
 Guitar: Martijn van Agt, Arie Storm
 Bass: Glenn Gaddum
 Keyboards: Ronald Kool
 Drums: Martijn Vink
 Backing vocals: Shirma Rouse, Ricardo Burgrust, Yerry Rellum
 Guest artist: Trijntje Oosterhuis

Guido's Orchestra
 Conductor: Guido Dieteren
 Arranger: Martin Gjerstad
 Violin: Marleen Matser CM, Karolina Andrzejczak, Lieke Arts, Kim de Beer, Mariam Buzghulashvili, Asia Czaj, Anne van Eck, Sophie Gabriels, Ewelina Krysiak, Marta Lemanska, Annelieke Marselje, Kristina Rimkeviciute, Julia Rusanovsky, Stefaan de Rycke, Rebecca Smit, Aleksandra Stadniczenko, Marcus Vliegen
 Viola: Anna Dushkina, Nadine Hilkens, Emerentia Knebel, Paloma Ortas, Mara Tieles, Joanne Wigmans, Kirsten de Witte
 Cello: Veronique Franssen, Judith Groen, Dewy Kersten, Nele Stuyk, Renée Wijnhoven
 Double bass: Rob Zuguers
 Woodwinds: Leentje Clijsters, Werner Janssen, Inge Peters, Wenny Roeffen, Kees Rongen, Dorien Schrooten, Greg Torunski
 Brass instruments: Nick Caris, Jos van den Heuvel, Luc van den Hove, Alex Loiacono, Jürgen Martl, David Mast, Guido Rooyakkers, Cleo Simons, Lars Wachelder, Nando van Westrienen
 Harp: Bob Heuvelmans
 Synthesizer: Falco Borsboom, Ron Cuijpers
 Percussion: Patrick Eijdems, Bas Lindelauf, Ruud Peeters
 Orchestra production: GD Music BV, Henny Dieteren-Franssen, Myrthe Pörteners, Wendy Kokkelkoren

Others
 Recording: Eurosound, Bram de Groot, Michiel Hoogenboezem, Wout de Kruif
 Mix: John Sonneveld, Tijmen Zinkhaan
 Mastering: Sander van der Heide 
 Production: John Mulder, Flip van Ommeren, Mojo Concerts, Kim Bloem, Junior van der Stel, Marjolein Zonneveld
 Artwork: Chris Kühlen

References

2014 albums
Anouk (singer) live albums